Michaela (Hebrew מיכאלה) is a female given name. It is a female form of the Hebrew name Michael (מִיכָאֵל), which means "Who is like God".

As of 2008, it was 357th in rank for newborn girls in the United States, and 325th in England and Wales. It is very prevalent in the Czech Republic, ranking at number 9 in January 2002, and number 16 in January 2006.

Variant forms
There are numerous variant spellings. Equivalents in other languages include:
Meical (Welsh)
Micaela (Italian, Portuguese, Spanish)
Michaëla (Dutch)
Michaiła (Polish)
Michaela (Czech, English, Lithuanian)
Michajlina (Belarusian)
Michala (Estonian)
Michalina (Polish)
Micheáilín (Irish)
Michela (Italian)
Michèle (French)
Michelina (Italian)
Michelle (English, French)
Micheline (French)
Miguela (Portuguese, Spanish)
Miguelina (Spanish)
Mihaela (Croatian, Romanian)
Mihaéla (Hungarian)
Mihaila (Bulgarian)
Mihajla (Serbian)
Mikaela (Finnish, Norwegian, Swedish)
Mikela (Basque)
Miķela (Latvian)
Mikhaela (Bulgarian, Ukrainian)
Mikhaila (English, Russian)
Mikhailina (Bulgarian, Russian)
Mikhaĭlina (Bulgarian)
Mikhaylina (Russian)
Mikkeline (Danish)
Mykhaila (Ukrainian)
Mykhaylyna (Ukrainian)
ميكيلا (Arabic)
מיכאלה (Hebrew)
Μιχαέλα (Greek)
Միքայելա (Armenian)

Notable people with this name
Mikaela (1935–1991), Spanish singer and actress
Mikaela Badinková (born 1979), Slovak actress
Mikaela Banas (born 1978), New Zealand actress best known for the TV series McLeod's Daughters
Mikaela Bastidas Puyucahua (1747–1781), martyr for Peruvian Independence
Michaela Bercu (born 1967), Romanian-Israeli model
Michaela Coel (born 1987), British actress, screenwriter, director, producer and singer
Michaela Conlin (born 1978), U.S. actress in Bones and Yellowstone
Michaela Denis (1914–2003), British-born film-maker
Michaela Dietz (born 1982), South Korean-American actress
Michaela Dorfmeister (born 1973), Austrian skier
 Micaela Martinez DuCasse (1913–1989), American artist, author, and educator
Michaela Eichwald (born 1967), German painter
Mikala Münter Gundersen (born 1968), Danish dressage rider
Michaela Kalogerakou (born 1998), Greek water polo player
Michaela Kargbo (born 1991), track and field athlete in Sierra Leone
Michaela Kirchgasser (born 1985), Austrian skier
Michaëlla Krajicek (born 1989), Dutch tennis player, sister of Richard Krajicek
Michaela McAreavey (1983–2011), Ulster Rose of Tralee 2004 and daughter of Mickey Harte
Michaela McManus (born 1983), American actress in Law & Order, SVU
McKayla Maroney (born 1995), U.S. gymnast
Michaela Michalopoulou (born 1980), Greek handball player
Michaela Odone (1939–2000), jointly discovered a treatment for adrenoleukodystrophy (ALD)
Michaela Paštiková (born 1980), Czech tennis player
Michaela Pereira (born 1970), CNN news anchor
Michaela Schaffrath (born 1970), German television actress
Mikaela Shiffrin  (born 1995), U.S. skier
Michaela Strachan (born 1966), British television presenter
 Michaela Tabb (born 1967), British/Scottish pool and snooker referee
 MyKayla Skinner (born 1996), US gymnast
Michaela Watkins (born 1971), U.S. actress

Name days
In Germany, Slovakia and Poland, the name day for Michaela is 24 August and 29 September, in Czech Republic, the name day for Michaela is 19 October and in Hungary  for Mihaéla is June 19 and August 24. In Bulgaria the name day for Михаела is 8 November.

Other uses

Organizations
Michaela Community School, a school in London

Fictional characters
Michaela Quinn, a medical doctor on Dr. Quinn, Medicine Woman
Michaela Pratt, a law student on How to Get Away With Murder
Michaela Stone, a police detective on Manifest (TV series)
Micaëla, a character in the opera Carmen by Georges Bizet

Songs
"Michaela", 1972 German song by Serbian singer Bata Illic
"Michaela", 1999 German song by Element of Crime
"Michaela", 2003 Hebrew song by Ron Shuval and Yoav Itzhak
"Michaela Strachan", 2007 English song by Scouting for Girls
"Micaela", a 1967 Boogaloo song by Pete Rodriguez
”Michaela” , a 2022 song by GRL BUNNY

TV
Mikaela, 2004 Israeli television series (מיכאלה)

References

Sources
Michaela at "Behind the Name"
Duden: Lexikon der Vornamen. 2004.

Feminine given names
 Hebrew feminine given names